Abdul Rauf Roofi is a Naat Khawan from Pakistan.

Career 
He likes to use a lot of musical instruments including the Arab percussion drums and traditional Pakistani Tabla , Dholak and Dafli ( Daf ) when reciting Naats.

Released Albums 
Some of his albums are:
 Al Madina Chal Madina
 Ausaaf-e-Hameeda
 Hum Tou Gulab Hogaye
 Patti Patti Phool Phool

Super-hit Naats
 Meetha Meetha Hai Meray Muhammad Ka Naam
 Who Suay Lalazaar Phirte Hain
 Agar Koi Apna Bhala Chahta Hai
 Rukh-e-Mustafa Ka Jamal Allah Allah
 Al Madina Chal Madina, Aaj Nahin Tau Kal Madina
 Rab Ka Pyara Aaya Hai
 Mein Madinay Ho Anwaan

Awards 
 Pride of Performance Award in 2005 by the Government of Pakistan.

References

External links
 Listen to 7 Naats by Abdul Rauf Rufi on wordpress.com website
 

Year of birth missing (living people)
Pakistani poets
Pakistani performers of Islamic music
Living people
Punjabi people
People from Faisalabad
Recipients of the Pride of Performance